The golden-faced tyrannulet (Zimmerius chrysops) is a species of bird belonging to the family Tyrannidae.
It is found in Colombia, Ecuador, Peru, and Venezuela.

Its natural habitats are subtropical or tropical moist montane forests and heavily degraded former forest. Until recently, it included the Choco tyrannulet, Coopmans's tyrannulet, and Loja tyrannulet as subspecies.

References

golden-faced tyrannulet
Birds of the Colombian Andes
Birds of the Venezuelan Andes
Birds of Ecuador
golden-faced tyrannulet
golden-faced tyrannulet
Taxonomy articles created by Polbot